Don Carlos Manuel O'Donnell y Álvarez de Abreu, 2nd Duke of Tetuan Grandee of Spain, 9th Marquis of Altamira and 2nd Count of Lucena (1 June 1834, in Valencia – 9 February 1903, in Madrid) was a Spanish noble and politician who served four times as Minister of Foreign Affairs, the name which then received the Spanish Foreign Minister. He was also Mayordomo mayor to King Amadeo I.

Biography 
O'Donnell was born on 1 June 1834 in Valencia.

The Duke was son of Carlos María O'Donnell y Joris, eldest brother of General Leopoldo O'Donnell, 1st Duke of Tetuan (several times Prime Minister of Spain), and Maria del Mar Álvarez de Abreu y Rodríguez de Albuerne, 8th Marquesa of Altamira and the granddaughter of Don Manuel Rodriguez de Albuerne y Pérez de Tagle, 5th Marquis of Altamira. In 1867 after his uncle's death, he inherited all his title and fortune.

O'Donnell served as Minister of Foreign Affairs four times: between 16 May 1879 and 7 December 1879, 5 June 1890 to 11 December 1892, 23 March 1895 to 19 January 1896 and 5 March 1896 to 4 October 1897. During his tenure he would attempt to push against the Monroe Doctrine in the face of the United States pressuring to grant autonomy for Spanish Cuba.

O'Donnell died on 9 February 1903.

See also 
 O'Donnell dynasty

References 

|-

|-

|-

|-

|-

|-

|

1834 births
1903 deaths
Marquesses of Spain
Counts of Spain
Counts of Lucena
Dukes of Tetuan
Marquesses of Altamira
Foreign ministers of Spain
Spanish people of Irish descent
Carlos
Conservative Party (Spain) politicians
Grandees of Spain